Francesca Kingdon (also billed as Frances Da Costa) is a British actress best known for modelling on K8TIE.com & playing Yasmin Salter in the ITV2 drama Footballers' Wives: Extra Time She also appeared in 8mm 2 and the London-based comedy film Filth and Wisdom, directed by Madonna.

External links

Year of birth missing (living people)
Living people
British television actresses
Place of birth missing (living people)
21st-century British actresses